Distler is a German surname. Notable people with the surname include:

 Hugo Distler (1908–1942), German composer
 Jacques Distler (born 1961), American physicist
 James Distler (1934-2015), American politician

See also 
 11037 Distler, main-belt asteroid

German-language surnames